From a Distance is a compilation album released in 1997 by Elaine Paige.

It is primarily a compilation of material from Love Can Do That and Romance & the Stage, but also includes live performances "One Night in Bangkok" and "Bohemian Rhapsody" from Elaine Paige in Concert, as well as "From a Distance", recorded during the Love Can Do That sessions but previously only released as a B-side.

The album was released on BMG's Camden label.

Track listing

 "I Only Have Eyes for You" (Al Dubin/Harry Warren)
 "From A Distance" (Julie Gold)
 "One Night in Bangkok" (live) (Benny Andersson/Tim Rice/Björn Ulvaeus)
 "True Colours" (Tom Kelly/Billy Steinberg)
 "He's Out of My Life" (Tom Bahler)
 "Bohemian Rhapsody" (live) (Freddie Mercury)
 "If I Love You" (Toni Jolene/Jim Weatherly)
 "As Time Goes By" (Herman Hupfeld)
 "Mad About the Boy" (Noël Coward)
 "Smoke Gets in Your Eyes" (Jerome Kern/Otto Harbach)
 "September Song" (Maxwell Anderson/Kurt Weill)
 "Oxygen" (Nik Kershaw)
 "Song of a Summer Night" (Frank Loesser)
 "Love Can Do That" (Diane Warren)
 "Well Almost" (Mike Chapman/Holly Knight)
 "Heart Don't Change My Mind" (Diane Warren/Robbie Buchanan)
 "Only The Very Best" (Michel Berger/Luc Plamondon/Tim Rice)
 "Grow Young" (Jimmy Webb)

References 

Elaine Paige albums
1997 compilation albums